Bashkim Rudi (born 1943) is an Albanian footballer. He played in one match for the Albania national football team in 1965.

References

1943 births
Living people
Albanian footballers
Albania international footballers
Place of birth missing (living people)
Association footballers not categorized by position